Michael Reinartz (24 December 1928 – 20 January 2001) was a German rower. He competed in the men's eight event at the 1952 Summer Olympics.

References

1928 births
2001 deaths
German male rowers
Olympic rowers of Germany
Rowers at the 1952 Summer Olympics
Rowers from Cologne